In mathematics, there are several theorems basic to algebraic K-theory.

Throughout, for simplicity, we assume when an exact category is a subcategory of another exact category, we mean it is strictly full subcategory (i.e., isomorphism-closed.)

Theorems 

The localization theorem generalizes the localization theorem for abelian categories.

Let  be exact categories. Then C is said to be cofinal in D if (i) it is closed under extension in D and if (ii) for each object M in D there is an N in D such that  is in C. The prototypical example is when C is the category of free modules and D is the category of projective modules.

See also 
Fundamental theorem of algebraic K-theory

References 

Ross E. Staffeldt, On Fundamental Theorems of Algebraic K-Theory
GABE ANGELINI-KNOLL, FUNDAMENTAL THEOREMS OF ALGEBRAIC K-THEORY
Tom Harris, Algebraic proofs of some fundamental theorems in algebraic K-theory

Algebraic K-theory
Theorems in algebraic topology